Otto Muehl (16 June 1925 – 26 May 2013) was an Austrian artist, who was known as one of the co-founders as well as a main participant of Viennese Actionism and for founding the Friedrichshof Commune.

In 1943,  Muehl had to serve in the German Wehrmacht. There he registered for officer training. He was promoted to lieutenant, and in 1944 he took part on  infantry battles in the course of the Ardennes Offensive.

After the war, he studied teaching German and History, and Pedagogy of Art at the Wiener Akademie der bildenden Künste.

In 1972 he founded the Friedrichshof Commune, which has been viewed by some as an authoritarian sect, and that existed for several years before falling apart in the 1990s. In 1991, Muehl was convicted of sexual offences with minors and drugs offences  and sentenced to 7 years imprisonment. He was released in 1997, after serving six and a half  years, and set up a smaller commune in Portugal. After his release, he also published his memoirs from the prison (Aus dem Gefängnis).

Viennese Actionism 
In the 1960s, Muehl's aim was 'to overcome easel painting by representing its destruction process'. He made rhizomatic structures with scrap iron ("Gerümpelplastiken"), but soon proceeded to the "Aktion" in the vein of the New York Happenings. In 1962, when he was 37, the first "Aktion" "Die Blutorgel" was performed in Muehl's atelier on Perinetgasse by Muehl himself, Adolf Frohner, and Hermann Nitsch. The "Fest des psycho-physischen Naturalismus" and "Versumpfung einer Venus" followed in 1963.  From 1964 to 1966, many "Malaktionen" were filmed by Kurt Kren and photographed by Ludwig Hoffenreich. In 1966, a new concept of Aktion was developed with Günter Brus: instead of the canvas, the body became the scene of action. In 1968, Muehl, Brus, and Oswald Wiener organized an Aktionsveranstaltung titled Kunst und Revolution in the University of Vienna, which caused a scandal in the press; they were arrested and Brus emigrated to Berlin.

From art to life 

Gradually, Muehl began to distance himself from "Aktion". He regarded the "happening as a bourgeois art form, mere art".  The "transition from art to life" resulted in the founding of the Friedrichshof commune as a kind of anti-society. The declared aim was the destruction of bourgeois marriage and private property, free love, and collective education of the children. In 1974 he played a small role as a member of an anarchic/therapy commune in Dusan Makavejev's Sweet Movie. In the eighties, tensions within the commune increased until they culminated in a revolt. When, on top of that, Muehl was arrested and imprisoned in 1991, the commune fell apart. In 1998, Muehl moved to Faro, Portugal to live in a new commune experiment.

Muehl's authoritarianism at Friedrichshof commune 

Critics such as former community member Andreas Schlothauer point to Muehl's strong authoritarian tendencies. For example, Muehl did not expose himself to the rituals of the Aktionsanalyse. He required members to crush the "body armor" (after Wilhelm Reich) and in some individual cases he experimented with the so-called “Watschenanalyse” ("slapping analysis"). He also created a "structure", in which all community members were placed in a hierarchical pecking order by numbering them.  He established a "first wife" and prepared his son to become his successor. Paradoxically, in the hierarchical level right below Muehl was a strong matriarchal element of rival women, according to Schlothauer.

Artistic activity after Actionism (1971 to 2013) 

From 1971 onward, Muehl produced no more public actions. He because a painter in the expressionist style, and held regular lessons on painting for his communards in his Friedrichshof commune. He also directed several short movies there, such as the "Friedrichshofer Kinderfilme" (Children's Films of Friedrichshof), which starred the children born within the commune. 

While serving prison time for the sexual abuse of minors, Muehl continued to be artistically engaged: he painted around 300 pictures and wrote about art theory.

In spite of his Parkinson's disease, Muehl continued to be artistically active into old age. In 2002, he developed a method of digital painting that he called "electric painting films".
Between 1998 and his death Muehl had two major solo exhibitions at the Vienna Museum for applied art.  
In 2010 Muehl celebrated his 85th birthday, on this occasion the Leopold Museum in Vienna showed an extensive exhibition of his late work.

Public apology 
In 2010 Muehl issued a public apology regarding the role he played in the Friedrichshof Commune. The apology was read out in a press conference before the opening of his exhibition at Vienna's Leopold Museum.

Quotes 

 "I've surely made mistakes in the community, but certainly not in sexuality." (Arte Metropolis, 8 December 2001)
 "Why should the government dictate when you should have sex?” (FAZ, 22 February 2004)
 "I'm not a child molester. This is nonsense. The girls were all developed. "(DIE ZEIT, 26 February 2004)
 "The statement of young people in the courtroom at that time made me speechless. I wanted to free them, but instead, I overwhelmed and offended them with sexual transgression.  It definitely was not my intention. I hope they forgive me."

Further reading 
 Aus dem Gefängnis, Klagenfurt, Ritter-Verlag, 1997
 7, (Exhibition catalogue) MAK Vienna, 1998.
 Impossible: The Otto Muehl Story by William Levy, New York: Barany Artists, 2001
 Leben/Kunst/Werk (Exhibition catalogue), MAK/ König; Vienna/ Köln, 2004
 Writings of the Vienna Actionists, by Malcolm Green, London, Atlas Press, 1999

References

External links 
 Otto-Muehl-Website
 Otto Muehl biographical overview and essay about Muehl and the commune Friedrichshof, written by Stefan Beyst, (August 2002)
  An interview with Otto Muehl
 Films by Otto Muehl at UbuWeb
 Thomas Dreher: Otto Muehl: Material Actions Nr.16 and 17, 1965 In German, with 20 illustrations (all photo prints of Otto Muehl's documentation "Bimmel Bammel" in the Archive Sohm, Staatsgalerie Stuttgart)

1925 births
2013 deaths
Austrian film directors
20th-century Austrian painters
20th-century Austrian male artists
Austrian male painters
21st-century Austrian painters
21st-century Austrian male artists
German-language film directors
Modern painters
People convicted of drug offenses
Austrian people convicted of child sexual abuse
People from Oberwart District
Obscenity controversies in film
Obscenity controversies in art
Controversies in Austria
Austrian contemporary artists
Austrian experimental filmmakers